Cherayi Panicker was the army Commander-in-chief of the zamorin dynasty. That  was a status or title given by the Zamorin to selected families  in the Malappuram district and the adjoining Thrissur district.  Today descendants  of two branches   reside in present day Ponnani taluk and Chavakkad area of Malappuram district. In the past, the Panikanmars  were the main soldiers of the Zamorin king. They belong to  the Thiyyar caste.  Cherai Kalari was very popular at that time i still exists.

Commander in War
According to M.S.A.Rao "The Thiyyar formed part of the army of the Zamorin of Calicut, which fought against Hyder Ali and Tipu Sultan. The Zamorin bestowed upon the head of the Thiyyar family in the North Malabar, the title of cherayi panikkar (proficient in arm)". The Cherayi Panickars in Ponnani taluk were  reputed for their proven mastery over the war science and their excellence in the tactics of swordsmanship. They were given  privileges at par with  the nobles and lords by the Zamootiri.

See also
Mannanar
Thiyyar history

References

Indian castes
Malappuram district
Malabar Coast
Thiyyar warriors